Tigran Balayan (Armenian: Տիգրան Բալայան; born October 29, 1977 in Yerevan, Armenian SSR) is an Armenian diplomat and historian, he serves as the Ambassador of Armenia to the Kingdom of the Netherlands and Permanent Representative of the Republic of Armenia to the OPCW..

Career Timeline 
 1994–1999 - Student in the International Relations department of the YSU with a degree in history and international relations.
 1999–2002 - PhD student in the International Relations department of the YSU. PhD in History (2002). The topic of the dissertation was "Nagorno-Karabakh issue and the international diplomacy in 1991–1994".
 2000–2002 - Student in the International Relations department of the diplomatic academy of the MFA of the Russian Federation.
 1997–2000 - Assistant of the Permanent Representative of the NKR in Armenia, responsible for the public relations.
 2000–2002 - Assistant of the Head of the Political department in the Embassy of Armenia in Russia.
 2002–2004 - Lecturer in the Russian-Armenian (Slavonic) University.
 2002–2003 - Attaché in the department of the Information and Public Relations of the MFA of the Republic of Armenia.
 2003–2004 - Attaché in the NATO division of the Arms Control and International Security Department of the MFA.
 2004–2007 - Third, later Second Secretary in the Embassy of the RA in the Kingdom of Belgium.
 2007–2008 - Acting head of the Media Relations division of the Press and Information department of the MFA.
 2007-2018 - Lecturer in the YSU International Relations department, since 2013 has the academic rank of Associate Professor
 2008–2010 - Acting spokesperson, as well as acting head of Press and Information department of the MFA
 2010-2018 - Spokesperson of the MFA
 2016-2018 - Acting Head of Information and Public Diplomacy Department of the MFA
2018 October-Ambassador of Armenia in The Netherlands
Author of multiple scientific articles, as well as the monograph entitled "Nagorno-Karabakh issue and international diplomacy in 1991–1994", as well as collection of lectures on “Multilateral Diplomacy”, “Information support of Foreign Policy”.

Awards 
 By the Decree of the President of Armenia as of March 2, 2015 has been awarded with the Diplomatic Rank of Envoy Extraordinary and Minister Plenipotentiary of the Republic of Armenia.
 Recipient of Ministry of Foreign Affairs Medal named after John Kirakossian for effective and successful performance of official duties (December 25, 2015).
 Recipient of the Presidential medal of “Mkhitar Gosh” (March 1, 2016).

Private life 
He is currently married, with a son and a daughter. His father, Kim Balayan is a member of the Constitutional Court of Armenia. In addition to his native Armenian, he is fluent in Russian, English and French.

References

1977 births
Living people
Yerevan State University alumni
Diplomats from Yerevan
Ambassadors of Armenia to the Netherlands